Sadova may refer to:
Sadová, a village in the Czech Republic
Sadova, Dolj, a commune in Dolj County, Romania
Sadova, Suceava, a commune in Suceava County, Romania
Sadova (river), a river in Suceava County, Romania
Sadova, Călărași, a commune in Călărași district, Moldova

See also